Narceus is a genus of large cylindrical millipedes of the family Spirobolidae native to eastern North America. The genus comprises three or four species, two of which are endemic to Florida, and the remainder forming a species complex. The species of Narceus include some of the largest and most recognizable millipedes in eastern North America.

Description
Their body color is various shades of brown with reddish to yellow stripes on each segment.

Species
 Narceus americanus / Narceus annularis complex - New England to Minnesota, south to Texas and Florida. Extends into  southern Quebec and Ontario in Canada.
 Narceus gordanus - Florida to South Carolina, possibly Tennessee
 Narceus woodruffi - Florida

The species N. americanus and N. annularis are widely distributed in North America, and may represent an intergradation of forms rather than two distinct species, a group known as the  "N. americanus/annularis complex".

References

Millipedes of North America
Spirobolida
Taxa named by Constantine Samuel Rafinesque